Miguel Ángel Orellana Arce (born 29 December 1989) is a Chilean footballer currently playing for Iberiat of the Segunda División Profesional de Chile.

Honours

Club
Iberia
Segunda División Profesional:

Individual
Segunda División Profesional Top Goalscorer:

References

External links
 
 

1989 births
Living people
Footballers from Santiago
Chilean footballers
Primera B de Chile players
Chilean Primera División players
Segunda División Profesional de Chile players
Unión Española footballers
Provincial Osorno footballers
Audax Italiano footballers
Unión Temuco footballers
Ñublense footballers
Lota Schwager footballers
Deportes Iberia footballers
Rangers de Talca footballers
Unión San Felipe footballers
A.C. Barnechea footballers
Santiago Morning footballers
Deportes Magallanes footballers
Magallanes footballers
Puerto Montt footballers
Association football forwards